The following lists events that happened during 1998 in New Zealand.

Population
 Estimated population as of 31 December: 3,829,200
 Increase since 31 December 1997: 26,500 (0.70%)
 Males per 100 Females: 96.8

Incumbents

Regal and viceregal
Head of State - Elizabeth II
Governor-General - The Rt Hon. Sir Michael Hardie Boys GNZM, GCMG, QSO

Government
The 45th New Zealand Parliament continued, with the Fourth National Government in power.

Speaker of the House - Doug Kidd
Prime Minister - Jenny Shipley
Deputy Prime Minister - Winston Peters then Wyatt Creech
Minister of Finance - Bill Birch
Minister of Foreign Affairs - Don McKinnon
Chief Justice — Sir Thomas Eichelbaum

Opposition leaders

See: :Category:Parliament of New Zealand, :New Zealand elections

National - Prime Minister Jenny Shipley
Act - Richard Prebble
New Zealand First - Winston Peters
United New Zealand - Peter Dunne
Labour - Helen Clark (Leader of the Opposition)
The Alliance - Jim Anderton and Sandra Lee

Main centre leaders
Mayor of Auckland - Les Mills then Christine Fletcher
Mayor of Hamilton - Margaret Evans then Russell Matthew Remmington
Mayor of Wellington - Mark Blumsky
Mayor of Christchurch - Vicki Buck then Garry Moore
Mayor of Dunedin - Sukhi Turner

Events 

2 May – By-election in Taranaki-King Country after the former Prime Minister Jim Bolger resigned. Shane Ardern retained the seat for National.
14 August – Prime Minister Jenny Shipley sacks Winston Peters from Cabinet after a dispute over the privatisation of Wellington International Airport. Peters subsequently cancels New Zealand First's coalition agreement with National.
22 October – Magnum Photo Supplies Ltd v Viko New Zealand Ltd, [1999] (1 NZLR 395) case is decided.
 New Zealand appoints a resident ambassador to Argentina and establishes an embassy in Buenos Aires.
 Until 2016, this year was New Zealand's warmest year on record.

Arts and literature
Michael King wins the Robert Burns Fellowship.
Montana New Zealand Book Awards:
Montana Medal: Harry Orsman (ed.), Dictionary of New Zealand English
Deutz Medal: Maurice Gee, Live Bodies
Reader's Choice: Malcolm McKinnon(ed.), New Zealand Historical Atlas
First Book Awards
Fiction: Catherine Chidgey, In a fishbone church
Poetry: Kapka Kassabova, All Roads Lead to the Sea
Non-Fiction: Genevieve Noser, Olives: The new passion

See 1998 in art, 1998 in literature, :Category:1998 books

Music

New Zealand Music Awards
Winners are shown first with nominees underneath. were:
 Album of the Year: Bic Runga - Drive
Salmonella Dub - Calming of the Drunken Monkey
Rob Guest - Standing Ovation
The Stereobus - Stereobus
Greg Johnson - Chinese Whispers
 Single of the Year: Bic Runga - Sway
Shihad - Home Again
The Feelers - Pressure Man
Darcy Clay - Jesus I Was Evil
Moizna - Just Another Day
 Best Male Vocalist: Jon Toogood – (Shihad)
Greg Johnson (Greg Johnson Set)
Booga Beazley (Head Like A Hole)
 Best Female Vocalist: Bic Runga
Sulata
Annie Crummer
 Best Group: Shihad
The Mutton Birds
Dam Native
 Most Promising Male Vocalist: Darcy Clay
Dave Yetton (The Stereobus)
James Reid (The Feelers)
 Most Promising Female Vocalist: Alesha Siosiua (Miozna)
Maisey Rika (St Josephs Maori Girls College)
Jordan Reyne
 Most Promising Group: Moizna
The Feelers
The Stereobus
 International Achievement: OMC
The Mutton Birds
Garageland
 Best Video: Mark Hurley - Home Again (Shihad)
Joe Lonie - Pressure Man (The Feelers)
Wayne Conway - Suddenly Strange (Bic Runga)
 Best Producer: Malcolm Welsford - Pressure Man (The Feelers)
Chris Sinclair - Kia Koe (Sulata)
Debbie Harwood & Stephen Small - So This Is Love
 Best Engineer: Simon Sheridan - Sway (Bic Runga)
Chris Sinclair - Kia Koe (Sulata)
Malcolm Welsford - Pressure Man (The Feelers)
 Best Jazz Album: the New Loungehead - Came a Weird Way
Trip to the Moon - Jazz Hop
Sustenance - Food For Thought
 Best Classical Album: Daniel Poynton - You Hit Him, He Cry Out
Alexander Ivashkin - Shostakovich Cello Concertos
Keith Lewis And NZ Chamber Orchestra - Opera Kings Gods And Mortals
 Best Country Album: Kylie Harris - Fancy
 Best Folk Album: Paul Ubana Jones - Blessings and Burdens
T&D Bigger Band - Hillingdon
AJ Bell - Ragwort Touch
 Best Gospel Album: Parachute Band - You Alone
Dennis Marsh - Faith
Invasion Band - You Call My Name
 Best Mana Maori Album: Te Matapihi – Te Matapihi
Maori Volcanics - Kia Ora
Dam Native - Kaupapa Driven Rhymes Uplifted
 Best Mana Reo Album: St Josephs Maori Girls College - E Hine
The Willie Matthews Quartet - A Treasury of Maori Songs
Nga Kura O Hananah - Nga Kura O Hananah
 Best Children's Album: Kids TV - Sing Something Simple
Tessa Grigg & Brian Ringrose - Where Are You Going Colin
Jules Riding - Kids Time With Jules Riding
 Best Songwriter: Bic Runga - Sway
Greg Johnson - Liberty
Jordan Luck - Change Your Mind
 Best Cover: Wayne Conway - Drive (Bic Runga)
Crispin Schuberth - Came A Weird Way (The New Loungehead)
A Penman & Ross (Finnart) - Calming of the Drunken Monkey (Salmonella Dub)
 New Zealand Radio Programmer Award: John Diver - Channel Z (Wellington)
Melanie Wise - Q92FM (Queenstown)
Kaye Glamuzina - National Radio

See: 1998 in music

Performing arts

 Benny Award presented by the Variety Artists Club of New Zealand to Dame Malvina Major ONZ GNZM DBE.

Radio and television
16 March: British children's television series Teletubbies premieres on TV3.
30 August: Prime Television New Zealand begins transmission.

See: 1998 in New Zealand television, 1998 in television, List of TVNZ television programming, :Category:Television in New Zealand, TV3 (New Zealand), :Category:New Zealand television shows, Public broadcasting in New Zealand

Film
Memory and Desire
Saving Grace

See: :Category:1998 film awards, 1998 in film, List of New Zealand feature films, Cinema of New Zealand, :Category:1998 films

Internet

See: NZ Internet History

Sport
 See: 1998 in sports, :Category:1998 in sports

Athletics
Mark Hutchinson wins his second national title in the men's marathon, clocking 2:24:51 on 25 October in Auckland while Bernardine Portenski claims her second in the women's championship (2:44:52)

Basketball
 the NBL was won by the Nelson Giants

Commonwealth Games

Cricket
Various Tours, New Zealand cricket team
 The Shell Trophy for 1998-99 was won by Canterbury, with Northern Districts runners-up.

Golf
New Zealand Open :Category:New Zealand golfers

Horse racing

Harness racing
 New Zealand Trotting Cup: Christian Cullen
 Auckland Trotting Cup: Christian Cullen

Thoroughbred racing

Netball
 Silver Ferns
 National Bank Cup
 Netball World Championships

Olympic Games

 New Zealand sends a team of eight competitors in six sports.

Paralympic Games

 New Zealand sends a team of five competitors in one sport.

Rugby league

 The Auckland Warriors finished 15th out of 20 teams in the first season of the National Rugby League premiership.
Auckland won the National Provincial Competition by defeating Canterbury 44-8 while Waikato ended the season holding the Rugby League Cup.
24 April, New Zealand defeated Australia 22-16
9 October, New Zealand lost to Australia 12-30
31 October, New Zealand defeated Great Britain 22-16
7 November, New Zealand defeated Great Britain 36-16
14 November, New Zealand drew with Great Britain 23-all

Rugby union
:Category:Rugby union in New Zealand,
 Super 12 - was won by the Canterbury Crusaders who defeated the Auckland Blues 20–13 in the final. Season summary
 National Provincial Championship - won by Otago
 Bledisloe Cup - won 3-0 by Australia
 Tri Nations Series - won by South Africa. New Zealand came last with no wins and only 2 bonus points
 Ranfurly Shield - Waikato held the shield all season, beating Poverty Bay 121–0, King Country 76–0, Bay of Plenty 25–18, Auckland 24–23, Southland 95–7, Nth Harbour 39–22, Northland 63–22, and Canterbury 29-23

Shooting
Ballinger Belt – Mike Collings (Te Puke)

Soccer
 The second National Summer Soccer League was won by Napier City Rovers
 The New Zealand national soccer team won the OFC Nations Cup tournament held in Australia, beating the host nation 2–0 in the final.
 The Chatham Cup is won by Central United who beat Dunedin Technical 5–0 in the final.
New Zealand U-16 team coached by Wynton Rufer travels to unofficial U-16 World Cup in France to coincide with 1998 FIFA World Cup. Achieve mixed results (0-3 v Italy, 0-2 v Cameroon, 1-1 v Austria, 0-1 v USA, 0-1 v Israel, 1-0 v Norway)

Births

January–March
 6 January – Eleanor Epke, squash player
 11 January – Thomas Mikaele, rugby league player
 25 January – Sione Havili, rugby union player
 4 February – Tevita Mafileo, rugby union player
 5 February – Tai Wynyard, basketballer
 6 February – Hayden Phillips, field hockey player
 11 February – Ben Sears, cricketer
 20 February
 Emma Cumming, racing cyclist
 Nicole Fujita, model and tarento
 24 February – Will Jordan, rugby union player
 3 March – Sione Asi, rugby union player
 4 March – Tom Christie, rugby union player
 28 March – James Fouché, racing cyclist

April–June
 2 April – Sam Fischli, rugby union player
 5 April – Michaela Drummond, racing cyclist
 9 April – James McGarry, association footballer
 13 April – Paige Satchell, association footballer
 17 April – Vilimoni Koroi, rugby union player
 18 April – Liana Dance, water polo player
 21 April – Jackson Wells, freestyle skier
 29 April – Fraser Sheat, cricketer
 30 April – Liam Wood, association footballer
 4 May – Waimana Riedlinger-Kapa, rugby union player
 7 May – Jess Watkin, cricketer
 12 May – Campbell Stewart, racing cyclist
 18 May – Brianna Fruean, environmental activist
 28 May – Logan Rogerson, association footballer
 16 June – Tanielu Tele’a, rugby union player
 19 June
 Ali Galyer, swimmer
 Harry Plummer, rugby union player

July–September
 6 July – Ma'ava Ave, cricketer
 9 July – Mikayla Harvey, racing cyclist
 12 July – Hoskins Sotutu, rugby union player
 15 July – Nathan Smith, cricketer
 18 July – Ella Harris, racing cyclist
 1 August – Rosie Cheng, tennis player
 2 August – Ricky Jackson, rugby union player
 7 August – Jesse Arthars, rugby league player
 22 August
 Leica Guv, Thoroughbred racehorse
 Adam Pompey, rugby league player
 28 August
 Morgan Harper, rugby league player
 Sarah Morton, association footballer
 30 August – Ngane Punivai, rugby union player
 3 September – Bailyn Sullivan, rugby union player
 13 September – Evelina Afoa, swimmer
 20 September – Isaiah Papali'i, rugby league player
 23 September – Bradley Slater, rugby union player

October–December
 20 October – Tasmyn Benny, boxer
 29 October
 Laghlan McWhannell, rugby union player
 Felix Murray, cricketer
 7 November – Rosemary Mair, cricketer
 17 November – Courtney McGregor, artistic gymnast
 19 November – Thomas Sexton, racing cyclist
 29 November – Xavier Numia, rugby union player
 4 December – Just An Excuse, Standardbred racehorse
 11 December – Rakai Tait, snowboarder
 12 December – Elizabeth Anton, association footballer
 18 December – Jade Lewis, tennis player
 22 December – Ben Beecroft, cricketer
 24 December – Nikita Howarth, swimmer

Undated
 Rupena Parkinson, rugby union player
 Henry Williams, actor

Deaths

January–March
 12 January – Neil Williams, water polo player (born 1918)
 14 January – Leonard Atkinson, public servant (born 1906)
 27 January – Gavin Downie, politician (born 1924)
 14 February – Peter Jacobson, poet (born 1925)
 20 February – Ces Blazey, rugby union and athletics administrator (born 1909)
 8 March – Kuini Te Tau, Ngāi Tahu kaumātua, welfare worker, community leader (born 1899)
 10 March – C. E. Beeby, educationalist (born 1902)
 15 March – Darcy Clay, singer–songwriter (born 1972)
 18 March – Vernon Clare, musician, cabaret owner, restaurateur, music teacher (born 1925)

April–June
 6 April – Sam Chaffey, alpine skier (born 1934)
 26 April – Sir Alan Boxer, air force officer (born 1916)
 30 April – William Newland, potter (born 1919)
 1 May – Brian Kendall, boxer (born 1947)
 14 May – 
 Ron Withell, boxer (born 1916)
 Jade Wilson, squash player (born 1977)
 15 May – Jack Warcup, mycologist (born 1921)
 20 May – John Trenwith, novelist, marketing academic (born 1951)
 2 June – Brian Johnston, field hockey player (born 1933)
 13 June – Henry Tatana, rugby league player (born 1945)
 21 June – Peter Mander, sailor (born 1928)
 22 June – Brian Davis, Anglican archbishop (born 1934)

July–September
 3 July – Elizabeth Riddell, poet and journalist (born 1910)
 5 July – Frank Creagh, boxer (born 1924)
 7 July – Maurice Holmes, harness racing driver (born 1908)
 17 July
 Marc Hunter, musician (born 1953)
 Ronald Tremain, composer, music academic (born 1923)
 26 July – Dixie Cockerton, netball player and coach, cricketer, school principal (born 1925)
 29 July – Alex Griffiths, conservationist (born 1911)
 31 July – Athol Meyer, politician (born 1940)
 3 August – Ronnie Boon, rugby union player (born 1909)
 7 August – Bill Laney, politician (born 1913)
 27 August – Essie Summers, novelist (born 1912)
 30 August – Sir Toss Woollaston, painter and writer (born 1910)
 12 September – Neville Thornton, rugby union player (born 1918)
 13 September – Sir Frank Renouf, stockbroker, businessman, philanthropist (born 1918)
 15 September – Amy Harper, photographer (born 1900)
 18 September – Andy Wiren, cricketer (born 1911)
 23 September – Trevor Berghan, rugby union player (born 1914)

October–December
 1 October – Jim Kearney, rugby union player (born 1920)
 4 October – Tony Shelly, motor racing driver (born 1937)
 18 October – Ilse von Randow, weaver (born 1901)
 26 November – Sir Charles Bennett, broadcaster, military leader, public servant, diplomat, politician (born 1913)
 6 December – Ken Comber, politician (born 1939)
 8 December – Aaron Hopa, rugby union player (born 1971)
 12 December – Phillippe Cabot, rugby union player (born 1900)

See also
List of years in New Zealand
Timeline of New Zealand history
History of New Zealand
Military history of New Zealand
Timeline of the New Zealand environment
Timeline of New Zealand's links with Antarctica

For world events and topics in 1998 not specifically related to New Zealand see: 1998

References

 
New Zealand
New Zealand
1990s in New Zealand
Years of the 20th century in New Zealand